The following is a list of entomologists, scientists who study insects.

See also
List of Estonian entomologists

References

 
Entomologists